Progressive Farmer is an agricultural magazine, published 14 times a year by DTN. The magazine is based in Birmingham, Alabama.

History
Founded in Winston, North Carolina, in 1886 by North Carolina native Leonidas Lafayette Polk (1837–1892; a Confederate Army veteran who is often confused with CSA General Leonidas Polk, no relation), the publication was intended to bring the latest information on crop and livestock production to the reunited nation's agrarian economy in the Southeast. After Polk died in 1892, Clarence H. Poe from Raleigh, NC, took over as editor in 1899, and in 1903, he and three partners purchased the publication, taking it from a newspaper to a magazine with 36,000 subscribers by 1908. One of the most notable achievements of the magazine was its continual crusade and endorsement during the early twentieth century of the land grant college subsidies provided to Agricultural and Mechanical colleges across the United States.

The magazine designates an annual "Man of the Year" award.

Merger with Southern Farm Gazette
The magazine broadened its reach beyond the Southeast by merging its Raleigh, North Carolina, operation with the Southern Farm Gazette newspaper published in Starkville, Mississippi. This was a major innovation in publishing at the time. Merging these two farm publications established the first publication in history to publish regional editorial specific to its circulation areas.  This merger of the Progressive Farmer and the Southern Farm Gazette resulted in the need to have a production and printing facility that would be a one-day train trip to both of the editorial offices in Starkville and Raleigh, North Carolina, for receiving the typewritten feature stories for publication. In 1911, it was decided to establish a central office in Birmingham, while Clarence Poe and his partners remained in Raleigh and directed company operations from there.

In 1932, Cully Cobb of Atlanta, Georgia, sold his Southern Ruralist magazine to Progressive Farmer. Cobb served for a year as the managing editor of the Georgia-Alabama edition of Progressive Farmer. In 1933, however, he accepted an appointment in Washington, D.C., in Franklin D. Roosevelt's administration as director of the Cotton Division of the New Deal agency, the Agricultural Adjustment Administration.

The Progressive Farmer Company continued to publish across the Southeastern and Mid-south regions soon expanding successfully into Texas and the Southwest. Serving farm information needs, publishing through two world wars, crusading for important rural farm issues such as rural electrification, soil conservation, rural education and modern agricultural technology, the magazine soared to a circulation high of 1.3 million by the 1960s.

Launch of Southern Living
In 1966, the management, led by Emory Cunningham and the editors of Progressive Farmer launched Southern Living magazine fashioned after the lifestyle and home life section in the magazine. The Progressive Farmer had extended its appeal among suburban housewives, and that segment of its circulation received the new magazine, Southern Living to establish its distribution and advertising rate base. From the pages of Progressive Farmer rose the largest and most successful regional publication in history. Consequently, Progressive Farmer was able to editorially focus more completely on production agriculture and concentrate circulation efforts to the rural farm household. The launch of Southern Living was an outstanding strategic move for the Progressive Farmer Company.

Midwest expansion
In 1980, the Progressive Farmer Company changed its name to Southern Progress Corporation in an effort to reflect its wider focus. In the early 1980s the editors of Progressive Farmer began a regional edition of Progressive Farmer in the twelve Midwestern states. It was distinctively different from the main Southern issue and was used to establish a circulation and advertising foothold in the Midwest. In 1985, Southern Progress Corporation was purchased by Time Inc. for $498 million. By the end of the decade, Progressive Farmer Midwest was incorporated into the main edition's editorial and circulation making Progressive Farmer a nationwide production agricultural and lifestyle publication with a circulation of over 700,000. During the 1990s Progressive Farmer enjoyed prominence among farm readers and advertisers with special editorial efforts in farm safety and rural recreation blended with production agricultural reporting.

New ownership
In 2007, after 130 years of publishing under the company it founded, Southern Progress Corporation, a division of Time-Warner, announced it had sold the Progressive Farmer magazine, circulation 620,000, to a former advertiser, DTN, based in Omaha, Nebraska. It was announced by DTN that Progressive Farmer would continue to be headquartered in Birmingham, Alabama.

DTN was acquired by Telvent in 2008. In 2017, Schneider Electric, which had acquired Telvent in 2011, sold it to Swiss investment group TBG.

References

Further reading
 Lauder, Tracy. The Southern Living Solution: How The Progressive Farmer Launched a Magazine and a Legacy. Alabama Review. July 2007, Vol. 60 Issue 3, p. 186-221

External links
  Homepage
 Archive of 1886-1904, at Chronicling America

Agricultural magazines
Lifestyle magazines published in the United States
Monthly magazines published in the United States
Magazines established in 1886
Magazines published in Alabama
Magazines published in North Carolina
Mass media in Birmingham, Alabama